George Abbey may refer to:
George Abbey (NASA) (born 1932), former director of the Johnson Space Center
George Abbey (footballer) (born 1978), Nigerian footballer.

See also
George Abbe (1911–1989), American writer